Tend may refer to:
 Bartend, to serve beverages behind a bar
 Tend and befriend, a behavioural pattern exhibited by human beings and some animal species when under threat
 Tending, or looking after trees, a part of silviculture

See also
 
 
 Attention (disambiguation) 
 Babysit
 Cultivation (disambiguation)
 Tenda (disambiguation)
 Tendency (disambiguation)
 Tender (disambiguation)
 Tendō (disambiguation)
 Tendon (disambiguation)
 Tendu (disambiguation)